David Rodríguez Sánchez (born 14 February 1986) is a Spanish professional footballer who plays as a forward for CF Rayo Majadahonda.

He amassed Segunda División totals of 392 games and 124 goals over 12 seasons, representing Ciudad de Murcia, Salamanca, Celta, Sporting de Gijón, Alcorcón, Osasuna, Numancia and Racing de Santander in the competition. He added 14 matches in La Liga (one goal), and also played professionally in England with Brighton & Hove Albion.

Club career
Rodríguez was born in Talavera de la Reina, Province of Toledo. After leaving Atlético Madrid's youth academy, he started professionally with Ciudad de Murcia in the Segunda División. However, the lack of playing time for the Colchoneros''' first team made him drop down to Segunda División B in January 2006, as he moved to UD Las Palmas.

In the 2006–07 season, Rodríguez returned to Atlético to play with the reserves and rank as their top scorer, a feat which he repeated the following campaign with UD Salamanca in the second division. Such solid performances earned him a transfer to La Liga, moving for €400.000 to UD Almería; before 2008–09 began, however, he was loaned to RC Celta de Vigo, returning the following summer to Andalusia.

Rodríguez made his top-flight debut on 30 August 2009, appearing in a 0–0 home draw against Real Valladolid. On 22 November, he scored after just five minutes on the pitch but Almería lost 3–1 at RCD Mallorca, and the player was only the fourth of fifth attacking option at the club during the season.

On 17 July 2010, after having been suspended by Almería, Rodríguez signed for Celta permanently, penning a four-year contract. In the first year in his second spell he netted 17 goals, leading the Galicians to the sixth position in the regular season and the subsequent promotion playoffs.

On 29 August 2012, having contributed nine goals in 28 matches to Celta's promotion, Rodríguez signed for second tier side Sporting de Gijón. He scored his first goal for his new team on 9 September, opening in a 1–1 home draw against CD Lugo.

Rodríguez terminated his contract at Celta on 30 January 2014, completing a move to English club Brighton & Hove Albion the following day. He made his debut in the Championship two days later, coming on as a second-half substitute in a 2–0 loss at Watford.

On 18 July 2014, free agent Rodríguez joined AD Alcorcón. He scored a career-best 20 goals in his debut season, helping to a final 11th position in division two.

Rodríguez scored his first hat-trick as a professional on 24 October 2015, in a 6–1 home demolition of UE Llagostera. On 30 June 2017, after 52 overall goals for the Alfareros'', he signed a three-year contract with CA Osasuna in the same league, for €350,000.

On 30 January 2019, Rodríguez was loaned to CD Numancia also of the second division until June. Upon returning to the El Sadar Stadium, he terminated his contract on 1 July, and agreed to a one-year deal at Racing de Santander on 20 August.

Personal life
Rodríguez's younger brother, Sergio, was also a footballer. A defender, he played as a senior for Atlético Madrid and Celta, in both cases only representing its reserves.

Career statistics

Club

References

External links

Celta de Vigo biography 

1986 births
Living people
Sportspeople from the Province of Toledo
Spanish footballers
Footballers from Castilla–La Mancha
Association football forwards
La Liga players
Segunda División players
Segunda División B players
Primera Federación players
Atlético Madrid B players
Ciudad de Murcia footballers
UD Las Palmas players
UD Salamanca players
UD Almería players
RC Celta de Vigo players
Sporting de Gijón players
AD Alcorcón footballers
CA Osasuna players
CD Numancia players
Racing de Santander players
Racing de Ferrol footballers
CF Rayo Majadahonda players
English Football League players
Brighton & Hove Albion F.C. players
Spain youth international footballers
Spanish expatriate footballers
Expatriate footballers in England
Spanish expatriate sportspeople in England